Metrioglypha is a genus of moths belonging to the subfamily Olethreutinae of the family Tortricidae.

Species
Metrioglypha aoriphora Diakonoff, 1973
Metrioglypha circulata (Diakonoff, 1966)
Metrioglypha confertana (Walker, 1863)
Metrioglypha crassa Diakonoff, 1973
Metrioglypha dualis Diakonoff, 1973
Metrioglypha empalinopa Diakonoff, 1973
Metrioglypha gemmarius Diakonoff, 1973
Metrioglypha habilis Diakonoff, 1973
Metrioglypha ithuncus Razowski, 2013
Metrioglypha onychosema (Meyrick, 1931)
Metrioglypha phyllodes (Lower, 1899)
Metrioglypha thystas (Meyrick, 1911)
Metrioglypha viridicosta Razowski, 2009

See also
List of Tortricidae genera

References

External links
tortricidae.com

Olethreutini
Tortricidae genera
Taxa named by Alexey Diakonoff